"Born to Be Sold" was the ninth single to be released by UK band Transvision Vamp. It became a hit in late 1989, peaking at number 22 on the UK Singles Chart.

Critical reception
Members of Swing Out Sister left ironic review on this single for British music newspaper Record Mirror. As per Andy Connell the song is "a dictionary of every rock'n'roll cliché" that readers "ever heard". But it is "resounding hit nevertheless".

Track listing
All songs by Nick Christian Sayer, except where noted.

7" vinyl and cassette single (TVV9) / (TVVC9)
"Born to Be Sold" - 3:45
"Down on You" (live version) - 4:31
"Last Time" (live version) (Mick Jagger / Keith Richards) - 5:18

CD single and 12" vinyl (TVVT9) / (DTVVT9)
"Born to Be Sold" (7" version) - 3:45
"Kiss Me" (Anthony Doughty) - 2:00
"Down on You" (live version) - 4:31
"Last Time" (live version) - 5:18

Charts

References

External links
 Worldwide releases

1989 singles
Transvision Vamp songs
1989 songs
MCA Records singles